STKRJ Tungku Area 1 is a public housing estate and village within Mukim Gadong 'A' in Brunei-Muara District, Brunei. The population was 1,332 in 2016. The postcode is BE2519. It is one of the estates for the Landless Indigenous Citizens' Housing Scheme (STKRJ), the public housing programme for the country's indigenous citizens.

Geography 
As a village subdivision, it borders Kampong Rimba to the north and east, Kampong Mata-Mata to the south, Kampong Katok to the west and Kampong Tungku to the north-west.

It is one of the STKRJ estates named after the nearby village Kampong Tungku.

See also 
 STKRJ Tungku Area 2
 Kampong Tungku
 STKRJ Kampong Katok 'A'

References 

Public housing estates in Brunei
Villages in Brunei-Muara District